An ecobrick is a plastic bottle packed with used plastic to a set density as a means of plastic sequestration and of creating useful reusable building blocks. Ecobricks can be used to produce various items, including furniture, garden walls and other structures. Ecobricks are produced primarily as a means of managing consumed plastic by sequestering it and containing it safely, by terminally reducing the net surface area of the packed plastic to effectively secure the plastic from degrading into toxins and microplastics. Ecobricking is a both an individual and collaborative endeavour. The ecobricking movement promotes the personal ecobricking process as a means to raise awareness of the consequences of consumption and the dangers of plastic. It also promotes the collaborative process as a means to encourage communities to take collective responsibility for their used plastic and to use it to produce a useful product.

Typically, producers use a wood or bamboo stick to manually pack plastic into the plastic bottle. Any size of transparent polyethylene terephthalate (PET) plastic bottle can be used to make an ecobrick. The bottle and the packed plastic are clean and dry to prevent the growth of bacteria. Plastic is cut or ripped into small pieces then packed little by little, alternating between adding the plastic and compacting it, layer by layer. The bottle is rotated with each press to ensure the plastic is evenly compacted throughout the bottle. This helps prevent voids and allows the packing to reach the requisite solidity needed for building block applications. Completed ecobricks are packed solid enough that they can bear the weight of a person without deforming—a density range between 0.33 g/ml and 0.7 g/ml. Maximizing density minimizes the flammability of the ecobrick while increasing its durability and re-usability.

Context 

The global ecobrick movement has emerged as the result of a number of local initiatives in locations around the world in response to the challenges associated with the management of plastic waste. As economic petroleum consumption and plastic production have increased, and as industrial waste management methods have struggled to keep pace, ecobricking has emerged as a local, non-industrial solution.

20th-century plastic development 

Petroleum-derived energy has enabled the growth of the global economy over the last hundred years. The widespread adoption of fossil fuels has enabled transportation and material technologies to develop. However, in the refinement of crude oil, 4-13% cannot be processed into high value, high energy fuels. This by-product is useful as a feedstock for the ultra-cheap production of plastic polymers. Since 1950 an estimated 8,300 million metric tons (Mt) of virgin plastics have been produced worldwide; 9% of which had been recycled, 12% were incinerated and 79% have accumulated in landfills or the natural environment.

Petroleum projections 

According to the American Chemistry Council, since 2010, $186bn is being invested in 318 new projects to fuel a 40% increase in plastic production over the next decade. If current production and waste management trends continue, roughly 12,000 Mt of plastic waste will be in landfills or in the natural environment by 2050. In addition, by 2030,  emissions from the production, processing and disposal of plastic could reach 1.34 gigatons per year—equivalent to the emissions released by more than 295 new 500-megawatt coal-fired power plants.

Plastic pollution and contamination 

A tremendous amount of plastic waste litters our planet every year, and its cost is huge. According to the United Nations Environment Programme (UNEP) 2014 Yearbook, plastic contamination threatens marine life, tourism, fisheries and businesses and the overall natural capital cost for plastic waste is $75 billion each year. Increasing scientific documentation is demonstrating many dangers arising from plastic degradation. When plastic enters the biosphere it releases toxins, fragments into microplastics and emits greenhouse gases that interfere with ecological cycles. When plastic is burned or incinerated, toxic gases like dioxins, furans, and polychlorinated biphenyls are released into the atmosphere. Photo-oxidative degradation caused by exposure to ultraviolet (UV) radiation and physical abrasion fragments plastic debris into smaller and smaller particles, known as microplastics. The degradation process corresponds directly to the amount of surface area of the plastic that is exposed as well as the length of time of exposure to UV rays. The majority of single use plastics are sheets and films with large surface areas and are highly susceptible to photodegradation. The photodegradation process also emits greenhouse gases, methane and ethylene.

Microplastics can have possible direct ecotoxicological impacts, accumulate in food chains and cause economic damage because of food safety concerns. Burned and incinerated plastics have been shown to release dioxins and other chemicals that are harmful to human health.

Rural community impact 

In countries and communities without access to industrial recycling or incineration, plastic has accumulated in streets, ditches, and beaches. Without large scale options for managing plastic households and communities have been powerless to manage their own plastic, other than dangerous and toxin-producing low-temperature incineration, water, and land loose dumping.

Failure of industrial recycling 

Between, 1950 and 2017 an estimated 8,300 million metric tons (Mt) of virgin plastics have been produced worldwide; only 9% were recycled, the rest have been dumped or burned. As of the early 2000s most industrial recycling was occurring in China where the majority of G7 countries were exporting their waste plastic. The processing of this plastic, in particular the dumping and incineration of unrecyclables, caused significant pollution in China. As of January 1, 2018, China banned plastic imports in its National Sword program. Since then, globally, more plastics are now ending up in landfills, incinerators, or likely littering the environment as rising costs to haul away recyclable materials increasingly render the practice unprofitable. The displaced plastic exports from Europe and America has been largely diverted to Indonesia, Turkey, India, Malaysia, and Vietnam where lacking environmental regulations have resulted in wholesale air, water and earth pollution around processing plants. Critics observe that industrial recycling relies on the energy intensive export of plastic to other locations, that industrial recycling isn't circular (processes turn a high grade plastic into a lower, less-recyclable form), and that recycling enables the unquestioned continuation of plastic consumption

The ecobricking of plastic 

The ecobricking movement has emerged from a growing awareness of the scale of plastic pollution, the problems it causes and the inability of industrial means to adequately manage plastic waste The ecobricking movement promotes techniques, methodologies and applications as a means for households, communities and cities to take responsibility for their plastic, secure and transform it. Ecobricks serve to sequester plastic, to put the plastic to use locally as building block, and as an alternative medium of community exchange

Terminal minimization of net surface area 
By packing plastic into a bottle, flat high-surface area wrappers and films are compressed together. This terminal minimization of net surface area means that the plastic is secured from the principal forms of potential degradation: heat, burning, friction and photodegradation. In addition, by ensuring that only clean and dry plastic is packed and permanently sealing the bottle, potential microbial degradation is also prevented.

Sequestration of plastic 

When ecobricks are properly made and properly applied in cradle to cradle design constructions they result in the effective plastic sequestration, of plastic out of the biosphere. In other words, ecobricks serve as a way to trap and secure plastic from entering the environment, degrading and causing ecological harm. In short-term ecobrick applications, such as milstein or Dieleman Modules  ecobricks can be used for up to three years without any damage to the bottle. By using silicone sealant or inner-tube-bands as short-term, non-permanent attachment methods, the ecobricks can be extricated undamaged at the construction's end and used again in another short or long-term applications. In particular, the long-term earth and ecobrick building method, results in gardens, parks, and earthen walls that ensure that the ecobricked plastic is fully secured. Earthen mortar will easily crumble when the structure is disassembled ensuring that the ecobricks can be extricated and reused. Earthen mortar also completely covers the ecobrick negating any possibility of heat, friction, fire or microbial degradation. Ecobrick sequestration thus prevents the breakdown of the contained plastic into microplastics and into green house gases through photodegradation.

The raising of ecological consciousness 

In contrast to industrial plastic management technologies, ecobriking directly involves the consumers of plastic in its process. The process of saving, segregating, washing, drying and packing plastic results in consumer/ecobricker reflection The meditative and communal tendencies of ecobricking raise individual and collective 'ecological consciousness' over time. Ecobrickers tend to pursue more information about waste disposal in their community, plastic, recycling and ecobricking topics. This leads to a steady decrease in the ecobricker's net plastic consumption.

Ecobrick building applications 

Ecobricks can be connected using tire bands, silicone, cob, and cement to build furniture, gardens, structures and more. Ecobricks are being used in different ways around the world. Ideally, ecobrick constructions use cradle to cradle design methods of combining the bottles—ensuring that the ecobricks can be extricated without compromise to the bottle at the end of the construction's life span. It is useful to differentiate between short-term ecobrick and long term ecobrick applications

Short-term applications 
Eco bricks can be combined together using tire bands or inner-tube-bands as short-term, non-permanent attachment methods to create applications that last months to several years. As short-term applications are not usually covered, such constructions are typically for indoor use, in order to prevent UV photodegration of the bottles. Short-term applications range from:

 Eco brick Milstein Modules: Hexagon and triangle modules that are used for sitting, but can be combined together to form one or two level horizontal surfaces. Applications include tables, beds, stages, etc.
 Eco brick Dieleman Modules: A geometric configuration of 16 eco bricks that enables a stackable LEGO module. These modules can be stacked horizontally and vertically indefinitely. Applications include indoor playgrounds, temporary stalls, sheds, and circular structure.
 Eco brick Open Spaces: A combination of hundreds of Milstein and Dieleman lego modules that enable the creation of interactive social spaces.

Long-term applications 
Ecobricks can be used with Earth building techniques (i.e. cob, wattle and daub, and adobe) to create structures that can last years or decades (it is not uncommon for traditional earth constructions to last centuries). In this way, earth mixes are used in between horizontally laid ecobricks as mortar. Ecobricks can also used vertically and with traditional construction techniques in the Pura Vida Atlan style of building. Both methods are careful to avoid the complete covering of ecobricks with cement which upon the end of the construction results in the destruction of ecobricks upon extrication. Examples of long-term ecobrick applications include:

Raised gardens: Ecobricks are laid horizontal and completely covered 
Raised benches: Two or three levels of horizontally laid ecobricks to make seats and benches.
Food Forest Play Parks: A combination of raised beds and benches to make a public green space, ideally filled with edible plants.
Walls: Ecobricks can be laid horizontal with earth mortar to build vertical walls. The walls can between standing posts and beams or as a circular standing structure. Alternatively, the pura vida method, uses chicken wire between posts to make walls from enclosed vertically standing ecobricks.

History 

The packing of plastic into bottles to sequester plastic and to make building blocks has arisen independently in locations around the world as a local solution to plastic pollution. Filling bottles with plastic waste builds upon the bottle building techniques of German architect Andreas Froese (using sand-filled PET bottles) in South America in 2000. Alvaro Molina began packing plastic into bottles on the island of Ometepe in 2003. Susana Heisse, in Guatemala began to encourage ecobricking in 2003 as a building technique and for solving plastic pollution challenges faced in Lake Atitlan communities.

In 2010, in the Northern Philippines, Russell Maier and Irene Bakisan developed a curriculum guide of simplified and recommended practices to help local schools integrate eco-bricks into their curriculum. Applying the ancestral ecological principles of the Igorots for building rice terraces, they integrated cradle-to-cradle principles into ecobrick methodology: ensuring that ecobricks can be reused at the end of the construction they are used in. Through the Department of Education, the guide was distributed to 1,700 schools in 2014.

Movements in South Africa began in 2012, when Joseph Stodgel brought the concept to Greyton, throwing an annual Trash to Treasure festival at the local dumpsite with South African, Candice Mostert, who started local school projects under Greyton transition town building with the bricks made by the community. The movement has since grown in South Africa, with organizations like Waste-ED, founded by Candice Mostert, who works both in Zambia and Cape Towns surrounds to educate people about plastic and its value, and the architect Ian Dommisse as the Ecobrick Exchange.

Case studies 

 In the village of Besao in the Northern Philippines, hospital custodian Jane Liwan set about packing one ecobrick a day to revamp her ailing home that her neighbors had been ridiculing. Two years later her home is a tourist attraction that has been featured in both local and national media.
 On the isolated volcano island of Ometepe in Lake Nicaragua, Alvaro Molina, distraught by the plastic waste that had nowhere to go in his community, began eco bricking at his hotel. His community is now one of the cleanest in the country, with dozens of local schools building with ecobricks and a micro-economy formed around ecobrick buying and selling.
 In New Mexico, USA, Jo Stodgel has run a community ecobrick project since 2014 through his organization Upcycle Santa Fe. The organization conducts regular ecobrick river cleanups, has built a number of structures at local schools, and also completed an important research project with Los Alamos National Laboratory regarding the offgassing of ecobricks. His organization also encourages the usage of milk cartons as well as bottles to make ecobricks.
 In Pune, India a community called Pune Ploggers is making ecobricks out of plastic collected in waste bins. Infrastructure support for the underprivileged communities is the purpose these bricks will serve in alignment to collaborate multiple SDGs.

References

External links
  EcoARK 
 The open source Vision Ecobrick Start Guide and Construction Guide are an opensource, translated and free resource available at www.Ecobricks.org. An international team develops and disseminates the Vision Ecobrick Guide globally.
 The Story Of Plastic Bottle Schools, May 9, 2018
Project Indonesian Ecobrick

Plastic recycling
Pollution control technologies